María Elena is a 1936 Mexican film directed by Raphael J. Sevilla. The film starred Carmen Guerrero (1911–1986), and Adolfo Girón (1904–1973). It also featured an early role for Pedro Armendáriz and Emilio Fernández. It was released in the United States by Grand National as She-Devil Island.

References

External links

1936 films
Mexican romantic drama films
1936 romantic drama films
Mexican black-and-white films
Films directed by Raphael J. Sevilla
1930s Mexican films